The Fanfani VI Cabinet was the 44th cabinet of the Italian Republic. The government held office from 18 April 1987 to 29 July 1987, for a total of 102 days.

The Fanfani VI Cabinet, composed only of DC ministers with some independent exponents, did not gain the confidence of the Chamber of Deputies following a surreal vote: PSI, PSDI and Radicals, that were excluded from the government, voted in favor of the confidence motion, while the Christian Democrats abstained. This government was born with the only aim of managing the electoral transition and had explicitly asked its "parliamentary base" not to vote in favour of the government during its presentation to the Chambers. 

The government fell immediately, 11 days after its formation, causing Fanfani's resignation and the early dissolution of the Chambers. The Fanfani VI Government has also been accused of an unprejudiced enlargement of the perimeter of the so-called "current business".

Party breakdown
 Christian Democracy (DC): Prime minister, 19 ministers, 33 undersecretaries
 Independents: 6 ministers

Composition

|}

References

Italian governments
Cabinets established in 1987
Cabinets disestablished in 1987
1987 establishments in Italy
1987 disestablishments in Italy